Colonel Ernest Elliot Buckland Mackintosh,  (3 November 1880 – 25 November 1957) was a British Army officer, engineer, and a Director and Secretary of the Science Museum in London. He was appointed Director and Secretary of the Science Museum following the retirement of Sir Henry Lyons in October 1933, and continued in the role until 30 November 1945.

Military career
Mackintosh was educated at Eton College and Royal Military Academy, Woolwich, then commissioned in the Royal Engineers in 1899. During the First World War he was mentioned in despatches and awarded the Distinguished Service Order (DSO) and the French Legion of Honour. After the war he reached the rank of colonel before retiring in 1933. He came out of retirement briefly during the Second World War to be commandant of the School of Military Engineering, Chatham, from 1939 to 1940.

Quotations

Publications
 E. E. B. Mackintosh, Special Exhibitions at the Science Museum. Museums Journal, Volume 37, 317–327, October 1937.
 E. E. B. Mackintosh, Preservation of physical apparatus of historical importance. Journal of Scientific Instruments, Volume 19, Issue 10, pages 156–157, October 1942. Institute of Physics.

References

External links
 E. E. B. Mackintosh, The National Archives, UK

1880 births
1957 deaths
People educated at Eton College
Graduates of the Royal Military Academy, Woolwich
Directors of the Science Museum, London
Companions of the Distinguished Service Order
Chevaliers of the Légion d'honneur
Royal Engineers officers
British Army personnel of World War I
British Army personnel of World War II